The 1914 Open Championship was the 54th Open Championship, held 18–19 June at Prestwick Golf Club in Prestwick, South Ayrshire, Scotland. Harry Vardon won a record sixth Open Championship title, three strokes ahead of runner-up J.H. Taylor, the defending champion. Entering the championship, Vardon, Taylor, and James Braid had five Open wins each. This was the sixteenth and final Open title for these three, the Great Triumvirate. Due to World War I, it was the last Open for six years; the next was in 1920.

Qualification took place the week before on 11−12 June at Troon, with 18 holes on the Old Course and 18 holes on Troon municipal number 2, and exactly 100 players qualified. Taylor and Ted Ray, winners of the last two Opens, led the field on 150 and 96 players at 163 or better advanced. The thirteen at 164 played an additional 18 holes at Prestwick the next day to determine the final four places; scores of 79 and better qualified.

After the first two rounds on Thursday, Vardon led at 150, by one shot ahead of a relatively unknown James Ockenden from West Drayton Golf Club. Taylor was a shot back in third at 152. One shot back after an opening 74, Braid's 82 in the afternoon dropped him into a tie for ninth.

Vardon and Taylor were paired together on Friday and, after Ockenden had a disappointing 83, they were clear leaders after the morning's third round. Taylor led on 226 with Vardon two back; amateur James Jenkins was third on 232 and three were tied at 233.

With the two leaders playing together, huge crowds followed in the final round that afternoon. Taylor extended his lead to three at the first hole, but at the third, he was distracted by a photographer and dropped a stroke to Vardon. The championship was largely decided at the fourth hole, where Taylor found the water and took seven to Vardon's four, which changed the lead. Taylor dropped more strokes to Vardon at the 5th, 8th, 10th, and 11th holes and Vardon led by five. Taylor recovered somewhat and shot 83, but Vardon won by three shots at 78 for 306. Phil Gaudin had the best score in the final round at 74.

This was the penultimate Open at Prestwick, which hosted 24, including the first twelve; the last was eleven years later in 1925. It was replaced by adjacent Troon Golf Club ("Royal Troon" since 1978) as the Open venue for southwestern Scotland. Turnberry was added to the rota in 1977, southwest of Prestwick.

Past champions in the field 

Source:

Did not enter: Jack White (1904)

Course

Source:

Round summaries

First round
Thursday, 18 June 1914 (morning)

Source:

Second round
Thursday, 18 June 1914 (afternoon)

Source:

Third round
Friday, 19 June 1914 (morning)

Source:

Final round
Friday, 19 June 1914 (afternoon)

Source:

Amateurs: Jenkins (315), Lassen (319), Hutchison (324), Lockhart (326),Anderson (329), Ouimet (332), Hope (335), Shepherd (338).

Scorecards
Final round

Source:

References

External links
Prestwick 1914 (Official site)

The Open Championship
Golf tournaments in Scotland
Open Championship
Open Championship
Open Championship